Animal Companionship is the third studio album by Advance Base, released on 21 September 2018.

Reception
The album received mainly positive reviews; according to online review aggregator Metacritic, it has a score of 78%, indicating "generally favorable reviews".

Track listing
All songs written by Owen Ashworth except "You & Me & The Moon" by Stephen Merritt.
"True Love Death Dream" – 3:45
"Dolores & Kimberly" – 5:05
"Your Dog" – 3:45
"Christmas in Nightmare City" – 2:10
"You & Me & The Moon" – 3:28
"Walt's Fantasy" – 3:06
"Rabbits" – 4:57
"Same Dream" – 2:28
"Care" – 3:21
"Answering Machine" – 1:07

Personnel

Owen Ashworth – pianos, synthesizers, samplers, sequencers, drum loops, singing
Howard Draper – lap steel on "Dolores & Kimberly"
Peter Gill – pedal steel on "Dolores & Kimberly"
Gia Margaret – upright piano on "Christmas in Nightmare City
Jason Quever – drums on "Care"

 Production

Animal Companionship was recorded by Jason Quever at Palmetto Studio, Los Angeles, with additional parts recorded by Owen Ashworth in Oak Park, Illinois. It was mixed by Jason Quever and Owen Ashworth, and mastered by Matthew Barnhart at Chicago Mastering Service. 

The cover features a painting by Jessica Seamans, with lettering and design by Dan Black.

References

2018 albums